Blake Massif is a compact block of ridgelines without a prominent culminating summit, rising to approximately  on the south side of Byrd Glacier in Antarctica. The unit lies between Lowry Massif to the northeast and Mandarich Massif to the southwest. It was named in honor of Sir Peter Blake, who died in December 2001 during an environmental awareness expedition on the Amazon River. He was an exceptional sailor, and sought to raise worldwide awareness of environmental issues, to help protect life in, on and around the waters of the world. He sailed to the Antarctic Peninsula aboard the Seamaster in January 2001.

References

 

Mountains of Oates Land